Aïn Turk nearby Bouira (Algeria) is a commune in Bouïra Province, Algeria.  Not far from Aïn Turk is located viaduct - one of the biggest in Africa, with 200 meter main span and 120 meter stems. The viaduct is completed in October 2008, its total length is 745 metres. It is situated in the middle of the National Algerian Highway Project.

Archaeological sites in Algeria
Populated places in Bouïra Province